Meir Leibush ben Yehiel Michel Wisser (March 7, 1809 – September 18, 1879), better known as the Malbim, was a rabbi, master of Hebrew grammar, and Bible commentator. The name Malbim was derived from the Hebrew initials of his name. He used this acronym as his surname in all his published works, and became known by it in common usage. His writings do not include works about Kohelet or Eicha.

Biography
Malbim was born in Volochysk, Volhynia to Yehiel Michel Wisser. His father educated him in Hebrew and the Talmud. After being orphaned as a child, Meïr was cared for and educated by his stepfather, Rabbi Leib of Volochysk.

At the age of 13, he went to study in Warsaw where he became known as "the Illui from Volhynia." At age fourteen he married but shortly thereafter divorced. The Malbim showed talent from his early childhood, and his works indicate that he had a considerable knowledge of secular sciences and history. From 1838 to 1845 he served as rabbi of Wreschen. In the latter year he was called to the rabbinate of Kempen, where he remained until 1859. He was thereafter also known as der Kempener Magid.

His first major work =, at age 25, was Artzas HaChaim - on Orach Chaim.

In 1859, Malbim became chief rabbi of Bucharest, Romania. He had disagreements with the upper class and educated Jews there, some of them Austrian citizens (called in Romanian sudiţi), led by the noted Dr. Iuliu Barasch. They wanted to introduce changes in the spirit of modern European life into the life of the local Jewry, as was done in some Reform congregations. Malbim defended the traditional style of Orthodox Judaism, which demanded strict adherence to Jewish law and tradition. He rejected almost all suggestions to edit the Siddur, give up beards or make other changes in exterior appearance, or to make other changes in observance.

Malbim opposed construction of the big Choral Temple, to be equipped with a choir and organ, similar to the Great Synagogue of Leopoldstadt in Vienna. He thought this was too Christian in style. In 1864 the Choral Temple became the main neo-orthodox synagogue in Romania. He also condemned the founding (before he arrived) of the first two elementary schools in Bucharest for Jewish children to offer a general knowledge curriculum. In this period Romanian officials encouraged such efforts to integrate the Jews into mainstream Romanian life.

Malbim's insistence on adhering to the halakha, such as daily inspection of butcher's knives, resulted in portions of the religious personnel (shochtim, dayanim) to become hostile to him. By their frequent complaints, his opponents almost succeeded in having him sent to prison. Malbim was freed through the intervention of Sir Moses Montefiore, but it was upon the condition that he leave Romania.

Malbim went to Constantinople and complained to the Turkish government, but obtained no satisfaction. After staying six months in Paris, he went to Lunshitz, in Russian Poland, as successor to his deceased father-in-law, Hayyim Auerbach (1866). Shortly afterwards he became rabbi at Kherson, and thence was called to the rabbinate of Mogilev, on the Dnieper (1870). There, too, he was a staunch supporter of Judaism and was  resented by the richer Jews; they denounced him as a political criminal, and the governor of Moghilev forced him to leave the town.

Malbim went to Königsberg as chief rabbi of the Polish community, but he continued to have conflict with Reform Jews. Malbim visited Vilna in 1879, where the community would have appointed him rabbi, but the governor of Vilna opposed the election. He did not want to sanction the appointment of a rabbi who had been expelled from Moghilev as a political criminal. Malbim declined an offer to be chief rabbi of the Orthodox in New York City. In September 1879, Malbim was traveling to Kremenchuk, where he had been called as rabbi, when he fell sick. He died on Rosh HaShanah, 1 Tishrei 5640 at Kiev.

Methodology and style 

Malbim's fame and popularity rest upon his novel commentary to the Bible. His first published commentary was on Megillat Esther (1845), followed by his commentary on most of the Hebrew Tanakh from then until 1876.  His commentary on the Bible is based most notably upon his  principle that there are no true synonyms in the Tanakh; apparent stylistic repetitions are not that, but rather each introduces a distinct idea. His approach is described as follows:

"Advancing a project initiated in Ya‘akov Mecklenberg’s Pentateuch commentary, Malbim formulates 613 grammatical principles to justify rabbinic halakhic exegesis in Sifra and elsewhere. To demonstrate the sanctity of scripture, Malbim devised a unique hermeneutic that he ambitiously applied to the entire Bible, resulting in one of the monumental Jewish scholarly achievements of the era: a wide-ranging, comprehensive commentary .... that infuses traditional Hebrew linguistic, philosophical, and mystical learning with contemporary concepts from science, psychology, epistemology, logic, and metaphysics."

Works
 "Artzoth haChayim", commentary and novellae on the Shulchan Aruch (section Orah Hayim, Breslau, 1837);
 "Artzoth haShalom", collection of sermons (Krotoschin, 1839);
 "HaTorah vehaMitzva", analytical and innovative commentary on the Pentateuch and the midrash halakha (Warsaw, 1874–80), including the linguistic guide Ayelet ha-Shachar on differences between similar terms in Hebrew;
 "Mikra'ei Kodesh", commentary on the Prophets and Hagiographa (ib. 1874; this commentary is in parallel, on the words and on the sense; Malbim always endeavored to explain the different meanings of synonyms);
 "Mashal uMelitza", dramatic philippic, in verse, against hypocrisy (Paris, 1867).
 "Eretz Hemdah", Commentary on the Bible according to the Midrash. (Vilna 1929)

References

External links

 Malbin, Jewish Encyclopedia 
 Judaism 101

1809 births
1879 deaths
19th-century rabbis from the Russian Empire
19th-century Romanian rabbis
Bible commentators
Chief rabbis of cities
German Orthodox rabbis
Romanian Orthodox rabbis
Orthodox rabbis from Russia
Volhynian Orthodox rabbis
Exponents of Jewish law